Playin' Hookey is a 1928 American short silent comedy film directed by Anthony Mack. It was the 69th Our Gang short subject released.

Cast

The Gang
 Joe Cobb as Joe
 Jackie Condon as Jackie
 Allen Hoskins as Farina
 Jannie Hoskins as Zuccini
 Jay R. Smith as Jay
 Harry Spear as Harry
 Pete the Pup as Pansy

Additional cast
 Jean Darling as Jean, Joe's sister
 Bobby Hutchins as Wheezer, Joe's brother
 Mildred Kornman as Baby
 Chet Brandenburg as Keystone-ish cop
 Ed Brandenburg as Keystone-ish cop
 Cameron Chase as Artie-Fro
 Edgar Dearing as Herr Dun der Blitzen
 Budd Fine as Joe's father
 William Gillespie as Moving picture star
 Charlie Hall as Moving picture star dressed as Chaplin
 Jack Hill as Keystone-ish cop
 Sam Lufkin as Keystone-ish cop
 Arthur Millett as Keystone-ish cop
 Lincoln Plumer as Movie-maker
 Tiny Sandford as Mike, studio guard
 Lyle Tayo as Joe's mother
 Dorothy Coburn as Woman hit with pie

See also
 Our Gang filmography

References

External links

1928 films
1928 comedy films
1928 short films
American silent short films
American black-and-white films
Films directed by Robert A. McGowan
Hal Roach Studios short films
Our Gang films
1920s American films
Silent American comedy films
1920s English-language films